Operation Finery was a British plan for military intervention in Zanzibar following the 1964 revolution.  It was a replacement for the earlier operations Parthenon and Boris, amphibious and airborne assaults.  Finery circumvented the reliance of the previous plans on bases in Kenya, where government and local support for intervention were not forthcoming.  Instead, Finery would have utilised the commando carrier HMS Bulwark to land Royal Marines on Zanzibar to protect Karume's government.  Because of delays in the deployment of Bulwark, Finery was supplemented by Operation Shed, which could be launched at shorter notice.  The expected coup did not occur, and Finery was scrapped on 29 April 1964, although Operation Shed remained in place.

Objectives 
The Zanzibar Revolution had occurred on 12 January 1964. Since then, British forces had kept a presence in the area to safeguard European citizens.   Since 30 January, British forces had also been kept on standby to launch a military intervention in the event that the radical left-wing Umma Party staged a coup to overthrow the President Abeid Karume's moderate Afro-Shirazi Party which controlled the governing Revolutionary Council.  The first operation with this objective was Operation Parthenon, which would have used two aircraft carriers, four other ships, 34 aircraft and elements of the Scots Guards, the Parachute Regiment, and 45 Commando of the Royal Marines. They would launch an amphibious and airborne assault on the main, southern island of Unguja before taking the northern island of Pemba.  Parthenon remained in place until around 20 February when it became known that the forces of the Revolutionary Council may have received military training from communist troops, the British Defence Council then decided that a different mix of soldiers was required.  Thus Parthenon was replaced by Operation Boris.  Boris would have made use of British airfields in Kenya to launch the attack. However it was decided that secrecy could not be maintained in Kenya, where some of the population sympathised with the Zanzibaris. So, on 9 April, Operation Finery was developed as a replacement.

Plan 
Finery would have involved a helicopter assault on Unguja, the main base of revolutionary power, by Royal Marines from the commando carrier HMS Bulwark.  The plan circumvented the need to operate from Kenya, where secrecy could not be guaranteed, and the government did not support intervention. It would take 14 days for Finery to launch once ordered since Middle East operations required the Bulwark.  To provide a more immediate response plans were put in place for a smaller scale operation which could be launched within 24 hours should evacuation of remaining British citizens in Zanzibar be required.  The merger of Zanzibar with Tanganyika to form Tanzania on the 23 April may have provided the catalyst for the Umma Party to attempt a coup and so from around this date Finery was supported by Operation Shed, an airlift of a battalion of troops, accompanied by scout cars, to seize Unguja's airfield and protect Karume's government.   The expected coup did not occur, and Finery was scrapped on 29 April 1964, although Operation Shed remained in place.

References

Bibliography 
.
.

History of Zanzibar
Finery
1964 in military history
1964 in Zanzibar